Duruca, historically Karnebi, is a village in the Kilis District, Kilis Province, Turkey. The village had a population of 568 in 2022. English traveler Mark Sykes recorded Karnebi as a village inhabited by Turks in early 20th century.

References

Villages in Kilis District